The first-generation Seoul Metro 2000-series is a class of South Korean electrical multiple unit trains manufactured by Nippon Sharyo, Hyundai Precision & Industries, Daewoo Heavy Industries, and Hanjin Heavy Industries between 1983 and 1994 for Seoul Subway Line 2.

Preservation 
After retirement, a handful of first generation 2000-series cars were either preserved or repurposed.
 1st batch car 2007 - preserved at the Daegu Safety Theme Park as a fire safety exhibit. The car was renumbered to 2046 before its retirement.
 1st batch car 2012 - preserved at the National Fire Service Training Center as a training car. The car was renumbered to 2058 before its retirement.
 2nd batch cars 2222, 2223, 2225, 2233, and 2333 - exported to Vietnam and used on the Hanoi–Đồng Đăng railway as push-pull coaches.
 3rd batch cars 2210, 2310, 2610, 2710, and 2744 - preserved at the old Gyeonggang station and used as an excursion train for the Hyunmoo Resort.

See also

 Rail transport in South Korea

References

Seoul Subway Line 2
Seoul Metropolitan Subway
Rolling stock of South Korea
Electric multiple units of South Korea
1500 V DC multiple units
Nippon Sharyo multiple units